Taekwondo at the 2007 Southeast Asian Games were held in the Auditorium, Wongchawalitkul University, Nakhon Ratchasima, Thailand

Medal tally

Medalists

Men

Women

External links
Southeast Asian Games Official Results
 
2007 Southeast Asian Games events
Southeast Asian Games
2007